The JDK Enhancement Proposal (or JEP) is a process drafted by Oracle Corporation for collecting proposals for enhancements to the Java Development Kit and OpenJDK.

In the words of the Oracle, the JEP serve as the long-term Roadmap for JDK Release Projects and related efforts.

Relationships with the JCP
The JEP process is not intended to replace the Java Community Process, which is still required to approve changes in the Java API or language but rather to allow for OpenJDK committers to work more informally before becoming a formal Java Specification Request.

See also
 Java platform
 Java Community Process

References

External links
 JDK Enhancement Proposals list page
 Open source JDK project